The 2014 VMI Keydets baseball team represented the Virginia Military Institute during the 2014 NCAA Division I baseball season. The Keydets played their final season as a member of the Big South Conference, as they returned to the Southern Conference in 2014–15. VMI was led by 11th-year head coach Marlin Ikenberry, and they play their home games out of Gray–Minor Stadium.

On February 21, 2014, VMI junior starting pitcher Reed Garrett threw a no-hitter against Lafayette in a 3–0 win. Garrett struck out 13 batters, including 5 of the final 6, in what was the first regular season no-hitter in Gray–Minor Stadium history, and only the second overall.

VMI ended the year with a 25–23 overall mark, and 11–16 in conference play, missing out on the Big South tournament for the third straight year.

Personnel

Returning Starters

Roster

2014 VMI Keydets Baseball Roster

Coaching Staff

Schedule

! style="background:#FFF; color:#000000"| Regular Season
|-  

|- bgcolor="#ffbbbb"
| February 14 || @  || Brooks Field ||  3–5 || R. Holden (1-0) || R. Ellis (0-1) || W. Prince (1) || 2,114 || 0–1 || –
|- bgcolor="#ffbbbb"
| February 15 || vs. #1 Virginia || Brooks Field || 0–12 || N. Kirby (1–0) || C. Bach (0–1) ||  || - || 0–2 || –
|- bgcolor="#bbffbb"
| February 16 || vs. Kentucky  || Brooks Field || 10–9 || T. Thomas (1–0) || Z. Strecker (0–1) ||  || - || 1–2 || –
|- bgcolor="#ffffff"
| February 19 || @  || Malcolm U. Pitt Field || colspan=7| Postponed (rain) Rescheduled for April 15 
|- bgcolor="#bbffbb"
| February 21 ||  || Gray–Minor Stadium || 3–0 || R. Garrett (1–0) || C. Ortolf (0–1) ||  || 219 || 2–2 || – 
|- bgcolor="#bbffbb"
| February 22 || Lafayette || Gray–Minor Stadium || 10–3 || C. Bach (1–1) || A. Farina (0–1) ||  || 298 || 3–2 || – 
|- bgcolor="#bbffbb"
| February 23 || Lafayette || Gray–Minor Stadium || 3–1 || A. Woods (1–0) || T. Schwartz (0–1) || T. Thomas (1) || 187 || 4–2 || –
|- bgcolor="#bbffbb"
| February 25 || @ #1 Virginia || Davenport Field || 3–2 || C. Henkel (1–0) || W. Mayberry (0–1) || T. Edens (1) || 2,689 || 5–2 || –
|- bgcolor="#bbffbb"
| February 28 || Buffalo || Gray–Minor Stadium || 2–0 || R. Garrett (2–0) || M. McGee (1–1) || T. Thomas (2) || 119 || 6–2 || –
|-

|- bgcolor="#bbffbb"
| March 1|| || Gray–Minor Stadium || 17–0 || A. Woods (2–0) || J. Stinnett (0–2) ||  || 191 || 7–2 || – 
|- bgcolor="#ffbbbb"
| March 1 || Buffalo || Gray–Minor Stadium || 5–6 || A. Magovney (2–0) || C. Bach (1–2) ||  || 122 || 7–3 || – 
|- bgcolor="#ffbbbb"
| March 5 || @  || Wake Forest Baseball Park || 3–9 || C. Johnstone (1–0) || C. Henkel (1–1) ||  || 127 || 7–4 || – 
|- bgcolor="#ffbbbb"
| March 8 ||  || Gray–Minor Stadium || 2–10 || J. Rogalla (2–1) || R. Garrett (2–1) || || 166 || 7–5 || –
|- bgcolor="#bbffbb"
| March 8 || Binghamton || Gray–Minor Stadium || 4–2 || B. Hawkins (1–0) || J. Cryts (1–2) || T. Thomas (3) || 154 || 8–5 || – 
|- bgcolor="#bbffbb"
| March 9 || Binghamton || Gray–Minor Stadium || 4–1 || A. Woods (3–0) || M. Kaufman (1–1) || C. Henkel (1) || 188 || 9–5 || – 
|- bgcolor="#ffbbbb"
| March 11 || @ Old Dominion || Bud Metheny Baseball Complex || 4–5 || G. Tomchick (1–0) || C. Henkel (1–2) || B. Gero (6) || 752 || 9–6 || –
|- bgcolor="#ffbbbb"
| March 12 || @ Old Dominion || Bud MethenyBaseball Complex || 5–15 || T. Bishop (1–0) || R. Bennett (0–1) || || 350 || 9–7 || – 
|- bgcolor="#ffbbbb"
| March 14 ||  || Gray–Minor Stadium || 1–6 || M. Boyle (1–2) || R. Garrett (2–2) ||  || 133 || 9–8 || 0–1 
|- bgcolor="#ffbbbb"
| March 15 || Radford || Gray–Minor Stadium || 1–5 || R. Meisinger (2–0) || C. Bach (1–3) ||  || 190 || 9–9 || 0–2 
|- bgcolor="#bbffbb"
| March 15 || Radford || Gray–Minor Stadium || 9–8 || T. Thomas (2–0) || N. Andrews (1–3) ||  || 177 || 10–9 || 1–2 
|- bgcolor="#bbffbb"
| March 21 ||  || Gray–Minor Stadium || 15–2 || R. Garrett (3–2) || B. Dees (4–2) ||  || 199 || 11–9 || 2–2 
|- bgcolor="#bbffbb"
| March 22 || Presbyterian || Gray–Minor Stadium || 6–5 || C. Bach (2–3) || C. Knox (4–2) || T. Edens (2) || 213 || 12–9 || 3–2 
|- bgcolor="#bbffbb"
| March 23 || Presbyterian || Gray–Minor Stadium || 5–4 || A. Woods (4–0) || A. Lesiak (0–2) || J. Kelley (1) || 102 || 13–9 || 4–2 
|- bgcolor="#ffffff"
| March 25 || @   || Plumeri Park || colspan=7| Cancelled
|- bgcolor="#bbffbb"
| March 28 || @  || John Henry Moss Stadium || 9–3 || R. Garrett (4–2) || M. Fraudin (1–3) ||  || 120 || 14–9 || 5–2 
|- bgcolor="#ffbbbb"
| March 29 || @ Gardner–Webb || John Henry Moss Stadium || 2–5 || A. Barnett (4–1) || C. Bach (2–4) || B. Haymes (1) || 75 || 14–10 || 5–3 
|- bgcolor="#bbffbb"
| March 30 || @ Gardner–Webb || John Henry Moss Stadium || 6–2 || A. Woods (5–0) || E. Heiligenstadt (1–4) || B. Hawkins (1) || 120 || 15–10 || 6–3
|-

|- bgcolor="#bbffbb"
|April 2 || @ VCU || The Diamond || 8–6 (12) || B. Lafin (1–0) || M. Lees (4–2) ||  || 960 || 16–10 || – 
|- bgcolor="#ffbbbb"
|April 4 || @  || Liberty Baseball Stadium || 0–5 || T. Lambert (7–1) || R. Garrett (4–3) ||  || 2,792 || 16–11 || 6–4 
|- bgcolor="#ffbbbb"
|April 5 || @ Liberty || Liberty Baseball Stadium || 0–4 || C. Herndon (5–1) || C. Bach (2–5) ||  || 1,459 || 16–12 || 6–5 
|- bgcolor="#ffbbbb"
|April 6 || @ Liberty || Liberty Baseball Stadium || 0–17 || P. Bean (5–1) || A. Woods (5–1) ||  || 901 || 16–13 || 6–6 
|- bgcolor="#bbffbb"
|April 8 || William & Mary || Gray–Minor Stadium || 5–1 || R. Bennett (1–1) || A. Fernandez (2–2) ||  || 149 || 17–13 || – 
|- bgcolor="#bbffbb"
|April 9 || Richmond || Gray–Minor Stadium || 4–2 || T. Edens (1–0) || R. Harron (2–1) || R. Ellis (1) || 111 || 18–13 || – 
|- bgcolor="#ffbbbb"
|April 11 || @  || Williard Baseball Stadium || 1–2 || C. Lourey (4–0) || R. Garrett (4–4) || J. Maloney (7) || 487 || 18–14 || 6–7 
|- bgcolor="#bbffbb"
|April 12 || @ High Point || Williard Baseball Stadium || 4–3 || T. Edens (2–0) || M. Krumm (3–5) || B. Hawkins (2) || 522 || 19–14 || 7–7 
|- bgcolor="#bbffbb"
|April 13 || @ High Point || Williard Baseball Stadium || 4–2 (16) || M. McQuaig (1–0) || J. Maloney (2–3) ||  || 512 || 20–14 || 8–7 
|- bgcolor="#ffffff"
|April 15 || @ Richmond || Malcolm U. Pitt Field || colspan=7| Cancelled
|- bgcolor="#bbffbb"
|April 17 ||  || Gray–Minor Stadium || 3–1 || R. Garrett (5–4) || M. Kuebbing (1–3) ||  || 129 || 21–14 || 9–7 
|- bgcolor="#ffbbbb"
|April 18 || Longwood || Gray–Minor Stadium || 4–6 || B. Vick (4–4) || C. Bach (2–6) || A. Myers (1) || 239 || 21–15 || 9–8 
|- bgcolor="#ffbbbb"
|April 19 || Longwood || Gray–Minor Stadium || 0–3 || A. Myers (5–3) || A. Woods (5–2) || S. Burkett (1) || 202 || 21–16 || 9–9 
|- bgcolor="#bbffbb"
|April 22 || @ James Madison || Veterans Memorial Park || 6–1 || C. Henkel (2–2)  || D. Horne (0–1) ||  || 623 || 22–16 || – 
|- bgcolor="#ffbbbb"
|April 25 || @  || Winthrop Ballpark || 0–1 || S. Kmeic (5–3) || R. Garrett (5–5) ||  || 257 || 22–17 || 9–10
|- bgcolor="#ffbbbb"
|April 26 || @ Winthrop|| Winthrop Ballpark || 3–6 || T. Shelley (2–1) || R. Ellis (0–2) ||  || 473 || 22–18 || 9–11 
|- bgcolor="#ffbbbb"
|April 27 || @ Winthrop || Winthrop Ballpark || 2–3 || J. Strain (6–4) || R. Ellis (0–3) ||  || 398 || 22–19 || 9–12 
|- bgcolor="#ffffff"
|April 30 || VCU || Gray–Minor Stadium || colspan=7| Cancelled 
|-

|- bgcolor="#ffbbbb"
|May 9 ||  || Gray–Minor Stadium || 2–6 || H. Bowers (8–2) || R. Garrett (5–6) || R. Thompson (13) || 237 || 22–20 || 9–13 
|- bgcolor="#ffbbbb"
|May 10 || Campbell || Gray–Minor Stadium || 2–3 || B. Thorson (3–5) || J. Kelley (1–1) || R. Thompson (14) || 296 || 22–21 || 9–14 
|- bgcolor="#ffbbbb"
|May 11 || Campbell || Gray–Minor Stadium || 6–7 (10) || R. Thompson (5–2) || C. Henkel (2–3) ||  || 237 || 22–22 || 9–15 
|- bgcolor="#bbffbb"
|May 13 || Old Dominion || Gray–Minor Stadium || 4–3 || T. Edens (3–0) || R. Yarbrough (5–6) || B. Hawkins (3) || 119 || 23–22 || – 
|- bgcolor="#bbffbb"
|May 15 ||  || Gray–Minor Stadium || 7–6 || R. Garrett (6–6) || T. Schroff (5–3) || B. Hawkins (4) || 263 || 24–22 || 10–15 
|- bgcolor="#ffbbbb"
|May 16 || Charleston Southern || Gray–Minor Stadium || 2–11 || A. Tomasovich (7–2) || C. Bach (2–7) ||  || 241 || 24–23 || 10–16 
|- bgcolor="#bbffbb"
|May 17 || Charleston Southern || Gray–Minor Stadium || 4–3 || A. Weekley (2–6) || B. Hawkins (2–0) ||  || 219 || 25–23 || 11–16 
|-

References
Specific

General
2014 VMI Baseball schedule
2014 VMI Baseball roster

VMI
VMI Keydets baseball seasons
VMI